θ Sculptoris, Latinized as Theta Sculptoris, is a star in the southern constellation of Sculptor. This object is visible to the naked eye as a dim, yellow-white hued star with an apparent visual magnitude of +5.24. It is located 71 light years from the Sun based on parallax. The object is drifting closer with a radial velocity of −21 km/s, and may come to within  in half a million years.

According to Fuhrmann and Chini (2015) this is an astrometric binary system, although Eggleton and Tokovinin (2008) deemed it to be a single star. The visible component is an ordinary F-type main-sequence star with a stellar classification of F5V. It is around 1.6 billion years old with 1.25 times the mass of the Sun and 1.40 times the Sun's radius. The star is radiating three times the luminosity of the Sun from its photosphere at an effective temperature of 6,395 K.

References 

F-type main-sequence stars
Sculptor (constellation)
Sculptoris, Theta
CD-35 42
3013
000739
000950
0035